Alin Zaharia is a Romanian footballer who plays for CS Afumați in Liga II.

Career

Afumați 

Alin Zaharia started his career on 2010, at then-Liga IV side CS Afumați. In 2011, he earned with Afumați promotion in Liga III. On 29 August 2011, he scored 4 goals in a 5-1 victory against Dunărea Călăraşi.  In 2011-2012 season, he was all Liga III series goal scorer. In 2012, he earned "Liga III The best Player of the Year" distinction, offered by Ilfov Sport.

Concordia Chiajna 

In August 2013, Zaharia signed with Liga I side Concordia Chiajna. On 19 August, he scored a goal in the 3-0 victory against Universitatea Cluj.  He scored again on 23 September, in 1-1 draw against Oțelul Galați.

References 

1987 births
Living people
Footballers from Bucharest
Romanian footballers
Association football forwards
CS Concordia Chiajna players
FC Voluntari players
CS Afumați players
Liga I players
Liga II players